Pokharni is a village located in the Parbhani District of the Marathawada region of Maharashtra State of India. It is known for a temple dedicated to Narasimha.

Demography
As per 2011 census, Pokharni has total 830 families residing. Village has population of 4,881 of which 2,250 were males while 2,231 were females.
Average Sex Ratio of village is 992 which is higher than Maharashtra state average of 929.
Literacy rate of village was 71% compared to 82.95% of Maharashtra. Male literacy rate was 84% while female literacy rate was 58%.
Schedule Caste (SC) constitutes 15% of total population.

Pokharni Narasimha Railway Station

Geography and Transport
Pokharni is in Parbhani taluka. Pokharni is located on Parbhani-Gangakhed road. Following table shows distance of Pokharni from various cities.

Narasimha Temple
Pokharni is known for grand old temple of Narasimha, a Hindu deity. Uniqueness about temple is, entrance of the main room where big deity of Narsimha resides is very small and one have to squat to enter in main deity room.

References

External links

Villages in Parbhani district